Iurie Chiorescu (born March 1, 1979) is a politician from Moldova. He has served as a member of the Parliament of Moldova since 2011.

References

External links 
 Parlamentul Republicii Moldova
 Pagină personală
 Partidul Liberal Democrat din Moldova

1979 births
Living people
Liberal Democratic Party of Moldova MPs
Moldovan MPs 2010–2014